Robyn Van En (1947 – January 1997) was an American organic farmer and pioneer of the Community Supported Agriculture (CSA) movement.

Community Supported Agriculture
Robyn Van En was one of the originators of Community Supported Agriculture (CSA), a business model that helps small, diverse organic farms cope with the expenses of organic farming methods by selling "shares" of the harvest to CSA members before the farming seasons begins. This prevents the farmer from needing to borrow money to cover costs at the beginning of the season, and promotes community support for the farmer, as CSA members share in the risk of farming by paying up front and receiving farm produce throughout the season. Van En started the first CSA in the United States on her Indian Line Farm in Massachusetts. Later, she helped create more than 200 other CSA farms as she travelled across the United States, proselytizing fresh, local, organic produce. She also travelled abroad to Canada, South America, Africa, New Zealand, Russia, and Hungary, leading to more than 1,200 active CSAs.

Memorials

Robyn Van En Center for CSA Resources
Featured on the 10 BerkShare note

Quotes

"With access to a farm, many are dazzled by the bounty and wonders of nature. I love to see grown people awed by the delicate beauty of a carrot seedling." ~Robyn Van En

See also
Eating For Your Community by Robyn Van En
Sharing the Harvest: A Citizen's Guide to Community Supported Agriculture by Robyn Van En and Elizabeth Henderson

References

External links
Robyn Van En Center for CSA Resources
Community Alliance with Family Farmers
The Sustainable Agriculture Research and Education Web Site

1948 births
1997 deaths
20th-century American businesspeople
Farmers from Massachusetts
Organic farmers